A salad bowl is a bowl-shaped serving dish used to serve salads, especially tossed salads.

Materials

Salad bowls may be made of any of the usual materials used for tableware, including ceramics, metal, plastic, glass, or wood. Salad bowls can also be made from renewable materials such as Poly-lactic Acid (PLA), wheat straw fiber and sugarcane bagasse.

Wood

In the United States from the 1940s to the 1960s, wooden salad bowls were recommended by many cookbooks. This fashion was started by the restaurateur and food writer George Rector, who in 1936 wrote a column entitled "Salad Daze". In that column, he recommended using an unvarnished wooden salad bowl, purportedly a French tradition. He recommended rubbing garlic into it for a hint of garlic flavor, oiling it regularly, and never washing it:

By that Christmas season, wooden salad bowls had become a fashionable gift item, and by 1949, the cultural critic Russell Lynes was saying that a highbrow person "wouldn't dream of washing his salad bowl".

The wooden salad bowl was criticized soon thereafter, even if it had a finish:

Use

Rubbing garlic on the salad bowl has a long history:
 Even in the United States, this predates Rector: an American salad cookbook from 1926 recommends it in many recipes.

Shape

Salad bowls may be of any shape and size, from very flat to very tall.

Notes

Salads
Tableware
Serving and dining